The 2nd Virginia State Regiment was a regiment of regular state troops from Virginia which fought during the American Revolutionary War.

Formation
The regiment was authorized by the General Assembly of the Commonwealth of Virginia in December, 1776 as a force of regular troops for the Commonwealth's defense.

In the Contintenal Army
In January, 1778, with low recruitment to the Virginia line of the Continental Army and in the wake of heavy losses to Virginia regiments at the Battle of Germantown, the 2nd Virginia State Regiment was sent by Governor Patrick Henry (per an act of the General Assembly) to join the Continental Army in the Philadelphia Campaign. By May, 1778, the regiment was in Valley Forge training with the Continental Army. The regiment camped at Middlebrook in the winter of 1778-79 and participated in the Battle of Monmouth. The regiment remained in the service of the Continental Army until late 1779 when called back to Virginia.

Disbandment
In April and May 1780, most of the regiment was discharged.  The remaining companies of the Virginia state regiments were organized under Colonel Charles Dabney in the summer of 1781 and were under his command at the siege of Yorktown. It was disbanded in 1782.

Field Officers 
 Colonel Gregory Smith
 Colonel William Brent
 Lt. Colonel Charles Dabney
 Major John Lee
Major Robert B. Bagby

Company Commanders 
 Captain Peter Bernard
 Captain John McElhaney (replaced Capt. Bernard)
 Captain John Lewis
 Captain Machen Boswell (replaced Capt. Lewis)
 Captain Harry Dudley
Captain Henry Garnett 
 Captain John Dudley (replaced Capt. Garnett)
 Captain John Hudson (Replaced Capt. Dudley)
Captain Thomas Bressie
 Captain James Moody (replaced Capt. Bressie)
 Captain James Quarles
 Captain William Long (replaced Capt. Quarles)
 Captain Benjamin Spiller
 Captain Augustine Tabb (replaced Capt. Spiller)
Captain William Taliaferro
 Captain Thomas Minor (replaced Capt. Taliaferro)
 Captain Nathaniel Welch (replaced Capt. Minor)

References

External links 
 The Muster Roll Project The Friends of the Valley Forge Park

2nd Virginia State Regiment